Birabresib (OTX-015, MK-8628) is an experimental small molecule inhibitor of BRD2, BRD3, and BRD4 under investigation for the treatment of cancer. It is in development by Merck & Co. It is currently in clinical trials for leukemia and glioblastoma.

References 

Experimental cancer drugs